Shah Mokhtar (also Romanized as Shāh Mokhtār; also known as Mokhtār and Shāh Mokhtār-e Soflá) is a village in Sarrud-e Jonubi Rural District, in the Central District of Boyer-Ahmad County, Kohgiluyeh and Boyer-Ahmad Province, Iran. At the 2006 census, its population was 93, in 21 families.

References 

Populated places in Boyer-Ahmad County